A transit district or transit authority is a government agency or a public-benefit corporation created for the purpose of providing public transportation within a specific region.

A transit district may operate bus, rail or other types of transport including ferry service, or may operate other facilities. In some cases, the transit district may be part of a larger organization such as a state Department of Transportation.

Australia
 The TransLink Transit Authority which manages buses, trains and ferries in South East Queensland, Australia;

Austria
With seven transport associations responsible for the nine federal states of Austria, it is the only country in the world that has transport associations for each federal state except for Vienna, Lower Austria and Burgenland which are organised in one association (Verkehrsverbund Ost-Region).

Canada 

In Canada, transit (or transport or transportation) is mostly of the domain of local government, with some coordination by the provinces.  Most Canadian cities have a transit authority.

France 
Île-de-France Mobilités supervises transport in the Île de France region.

Germany 

United Kingdom
Transport for London, which operates the London Underground, London Overground and the DLR, an extensive bus network, tram services, riverboat services, the Public Carriage Office (responsible for black cabs), London Dial-a-Ride, streets in London, the London congestion charge and a limited coach service. The Oyster card electronic ticketing scheme is also operated by Transport for London, and can be used on the underground, overground, buses, trams and the DLR.

United States
In the United States, a transit district is a special-purpose district organized either as a corporation chartered by statute or as a government agency. A district is usually contained within one state, but in rare circumstances may cover two or more states. The term used depends on which part of the country the agency is created in. Typically, western states will create a "transit district" and eastern states create a "transit authority" but the type of agency is generally the same.

A transit district is created to give it the power of the government in dealing with solving problems related to transit issues. This includes the powers of eminent domain to obtain space for rights-of-way (e.g. for railways or busways), the ability to impose excise, income, property, and/or sales taxes to fund subsidies of operating costs of local transportation, and the ability to operate independently of the cities and counties that the transit district operates within. A transit district may also have its own transit police force, although in some areas the local police provide a special bureau for this purpose.

Some of the more famous transit districts in the U.S. include:
 The Metropolitan Transportation Authority (MTA), serving 12 counties in southeastern New York state including New York City, along with two counties in southwestern Connecticut under contract to the Connecticut Department of Transportation; 
 The New York City Transit Authority which operates New York City's subway trains and municipal buses;
 The Port Authority of New York and New Jersey which operates New York City's Port Authority Bus Terminal and the Port Authority Trans-Hudson (PATH) trains, and was the owner of the World Trade Center complex;
 The Washington Metropolitan Area Transit Authority, which operates the bus and Metrorail system in Washington, D.C. and suburban Maryland and Virginia;
 The former Southern California Rapid Transit District, which operated most of the bus systems in Los Angeles County, California as well as parts of Orange, Riverside and San Bernardino counties from August 18, 1964, until April 1, 1993, when it was converted into the Los Angeles County Metropolitan Transportation Authority;
 The Chicago Transit Authority, which operates all bus routes which run within the boundaries of Chicago, as well as the Chicago 'L';
 The Central Puget Sound Regional Transit Authority, shortened to Sound Transit (ST), which operates Sounder (commuter rail), Link (light rail), and ST Express bus service in the Seattle metropolitan area;
 The Utah Transit Authority (UTA), which operates the FrontRunner (commuter rail), TRAX (light rail), and bus service along the Wasatch Front (Salt Lake-Odgen-Provo metropolitan area);

See also
Journey planner
 Passenger transport executive
Sustainable transport
Transit pass

References

Public transport